An adowlie (also adholee, adholy, adowly) is an obsolete unit of dry volume and mass formerly used in western India a standard measurement for grain and salt.

 As a dry measure for salt, it equalled approximately 2.509 litres (2.28 Imperial quarts).
 As a measure of mass, it was roughly 1.982 kg (4.37 lb). A heavy adowlie was approximately 2.031 kg (4.478 lb)

After metrification in the mid-20th century, the unit became obsolete.

See also
List of customary units of measurement in South Asia

References

Units of mass
Units of volume
Customary units in India
Obsolete units of measurement